In My Mind is the second studio album by American singer-songwriter BJ the Chicago Kid. The album, which serves as his major label debut, was released by Motown, on February 19, 2016. In My Mind received a nomination for Best R&B Album at the 59th Annual Grammy Awards.

Background
The album was recorded in roughly 30 days, including several nights where BJ slept in the studio. Some of the collaborations on the album, including Kendrick Lamar and Chance the Rapper, were formed with artists that BJ had been friends with for many years prior. BJ was initially introduced to Big K.R.I.T. on Twitter through a mutual friend, which led to the song "The Resume." The pair did not meet in person until the first day of the tour for the album.

Critical reception

Upon its release, In My Mind received critical acclaim from music critics. At Metacritic, which assigns a normalized rating out of 100 to reviews from mainstream critics, the album received an average score of 84 based on 7 reviews, which indicates "universal acclaim". In a glowing review for Exclaim!, Michael J. Warren called In My Mind "the most earnest soul album in years," saying that the record is "the proof that his ascension is hardly luck, but rather the result of a 15-year grind and a tremendous work ethic."

Track listing

Note
  indicates a co-producer
  indicates an additional producer

Personnel
Musicians

 BJ the Chicago Kid – vocals (all tracks), drums (track 13)
 Rex Rideout – programming (1), piano (14)
 THX – additional keyboards (2, 14), synthesizer (12)
 Buddy – additional vocals (2)
 Constantine – additional vocals (2)
 Paul Morton, Jr. – additional vocals (2), organ (9, 15)
 Uncle Dave – guitar (2)
 Mike & Keys – keyboards, prorgamming (2, 12)
 Rumeal Eggleston – bass guitar (4)
 Jairus Mozee – guitar (4, 8, 9, 11, 15), bass guitar (15)
 Jeff Villaluna – guitar (4)
 The Regiment Horns – horns (4, 9, 15)
 Cornelio Austin – keyboards (4, 11), programming (4, 11), piano (11)
 Isabelle Chiappini – spoken word (4)
 Marcus Kincy – additional keyboards (5, 7, 12)
 Sean Cooper – keyboards, programming (5)
 Aaron Sledge – background vocals (6, 7, 14)
 DJ Reflex – piano, programming (6)
 Matthew Edwards – piano, programming (6)
 Matt Jones – strings (6, 11, 14)
 Joakima Lynch – spoken word (7)
 Isa Elliot – vocals (7)
 Kevin Randolph – organ (8), keyboards (15)
 Aaron Camper – additional vocals (9)
 Uncle Chucc – additional vocals (9)
 Eric Ingram – bass guitar (9, 11)
 David Haddon – drums (9, 15)
 Richard Sledge – percussion (9)
 Amaire Johnson – piano (9)
 Calvin Frazier – guitar (9, 11)
 Craig Brockman – piano (15)

Technical
 Robert Vosgien – mastering
 Erik Madrid – mixing (2, 3, 7, 8, 12, 14)
 Richard Furch – mixing (4, 6, 9, 11, 15)
 Joe Syring – mixing (5, 10, 13), engineering (2–15), editing (2, 12, 14)
 Rex Rideout – mixing (13), engineering (1–3, 6–8, 12–14), editing (2, 6, 7, 11, 12, 14)
 Steve Olmon – engineering (2–4, 6–8, 11–14)
 Jazz Sommers – engineering (7)
 Derek Ali – engineering (10)
 Aaron Sledge – vocal production
 Vincent Wu – mixing assistance (2, 3, 7, 8, 12, 14)
 Jorel Corpus – mixing assistance (4, 6, 9, 11, 15)
 Ervin Ablaev – engineering assistance
 Harold Lilly – assistance
 Che Pope – assistance

Artwork
 The Young Astronauts – art direction, photography
 Dead Dilly – art direction

Charts

References

2016 albums
Motown albums
Albums produced by Big K.R.I.T.
Contemporary R&B albums by American artists
Albums produced by Da Internz
Albums produced by DJ Khalil